In Between Dying is a 2020 internationally co-produced road drama film co-written, edited and directed by . It was also co-produced by Carlos Reygadas and Joslyn Barnes, while Danny Glover and Susan Cohn Rockefeller serve as executive producers through their company Louverture Films. The film was selected to be shown in the main competition section of the 77th Venice International Film Festival.

Cast

References

External links
 

2020 drama films
Azerbaijani drama films
Mexican drama films
American drama road movies
Azerbaijani-language films
2020s drama road movies
2020s American films